This is a list of ended Turkish television series.

Comedy

Drama

References

Television 
List
Turkey